was a feudal domain in Edo period Japan, located in Dewa Province (modern-day Yamagata Prefecture), Japan. It was centered on Yamagata Castle in what is now the city of Yamagata. Unlike some han whose control was relatively stable throughout the Edo period (1603–1867), Yamagata changed hands a great number of times during its history.

History
Much of Dewa Province was controlled by the powerful Mogami clan during the Sengoku period. After Toyotomi Hideyoshi assigned the Uesugi clan to Aizu, senior Uesugi retainer Naoe Kanetsugu established himself at the neighboring Yonezawa Domain, with an army of 20,000 and gradually expanded his control north into Mogami territory. However, with the help of the Date clan under Date Masamune, the Mogami were able to defend Yamagata until Naoe was forced to withdraw following the defeat of the pro-Toyotomi forces at the Battle of Sekigahara.

During the Tokugawa shogunate, in 1600, the Mogami were initially confirmed in their holdings, with an assessed income of 570,000 koku, which was the 5th largest domain in Japan at the time. However, with after the death of Mogami Yoshiaki, the clan underwent a number of inheritance struggles, and was dispossessed by the Tokugawa shogunate, and a much reduced Yamagata Domain (220,000 koku) was then assigned to the Torii clan in 1622. Torii Tadatsune died without an heir in 1636, and Yamagata was reassigned to Hoshina Masayuki (with a further reduction to 200,000 koku) until he was assigned to rule Aizu Domain in 1643.

Reduced further to 150,000 koku, and then to 100,000 koku and finally to 60,000 koku, domain was then ruled by several branches of the Matsudaira clan or the Okudaira clan, subsidiary branches of the shogunal Tokugawa clan from 1643 to 1764.
The domain had a population of 13,032 people in 2157 households per the 1697 census. The domain maintained its primary residence (kamiyashiki) in Edo at Daimyō-kōji, in Marunouchi.

In 1767, Yamagata Domain was assigned to the Akimoto clan, formerly of Kawagoe Domain, who ruled for four generations until 1845. During the Bakumatsu period, the domain was assigned to its final rulers, the Mizuno clan. It was now reduced to only 50,000 koku. Mizuno Tadakiyo served as Jisha-bugyō and wakadoshiyori in the shogunal administration and in 1862, became a rōjū in the service of Shōgun Tokugawa Iemochi.

During the Boshin War, Yamagata Domain was a member of the Ōuetsu Reppan Dōmei; although its final daimyō, Mizuno Tadahiro was only 13 years old. The domain switched sides to the pro-Imperial forces in June 1869.

The new Meiji government seized the domain, and exiled Mizuno Tadahiro to a newly created 50,000 koku Asahiyama Domain in Ōmi Province in 1870. With the abolition of the han system in July 1871, the former Yamagata Domain became the nucleus of the new Yamagata Prefecture.

List of daimyōs

Further reading

Sasaki Suguru (2004). Boshin Sensō 戊辰戦争. Tokyo: Chuokōron-shinsha.

External links
  Yamagata on "Edo 300 HTML"

Notes

Domains of Japan
1623 establishments in Japan
States and territories established in 1623
1870 disestablishments in Japan
States and territories disestablished in 1870
Dewa Province
History of Yamagata Prefecture
Ōuetsu Reppan Dōmei
Aizu-Matsudaira clan
Hotta clan
Maebashi-Matsudaira clan
Mizuno clan
Ogyū-Matsudaira clan
Okudaira clan
Okudaira-Matsudaira clan
Torii clan